The women's K-1 500 metres event was an individual kayaking event conducted as part of the Canoeing at the 1976 Summer Olympics program.

Medalists

Results

Heats
The 15 competitors first raced in two heats on July 28. The top three finishers from each of the heats advanced directly to the semifinals while the rest competed in the repechages.

Repechages
Taking place on July 28, the top three finishers from each repechage advanced to the semifinals.

Semifinals
The top three finishers in each of the three semifinals (raced on July 30) advanced to the final.

Final
The final was held on July 30.

References
1976 Summer Olympics official report Volume 3. pp. 169. 
Sports-reference.com 1976 women's K-1 500 m results.
Wallechinsky, David and Jaime Loucky (2008). "Canoeing: Women's Kayak Singles 500 Meters". In The Complete Book of the Olympics: 2008 Edition. London: Aurum Press Limited. p. 491.

Women's K-1 500
Olympic
Women's events at the 1976 Summer Olympics